Hendrik Jan Davids and Andrew Kratzmann were the defending champions, but did not participate this year.

Mariano Hood and Sebastián Prieto won the title, defeating Massimo Bertolini and Devin Bowen 7–6, 6–7, 7–6 in the final.

Seeds

  Daniel Orsanic /  David Roditi (quarterfinals)
  Julián Alonso /  Nicolás Lapentti (first round)
  Mariano Hood /  Sebastián Prieto (champions)
  Brandon Coupe /  Paul Rosner (first round)

Draw

Draw

References
Draw

Chile Open (tennis)
1998 ATP Tour